Burnley Football Club is an English professional association football club based in the town of Burnley, Lancashire. Founded on 18 May 1882, the club was one of the first to become professional (in 1883), putting pressure on the Football Association (FA) to permit payments to players. In 1885, the FA legalised professionalism, so the team entered the FA Cup for the first time in 1885–86, and were one of the twelve founding members of the Football League in 1888–89. Burnley have played in all four professional divisions of English football from 1888 to the present day. The team have been champions of England twice, in 1920–21 and 1959–60, have won the FA Cup once, in 1913–14, and have won the FA Charity Shield twice, in 1960 and 1973. Burnley are one of only five teams to have won all four professional divisions of English football, along with Wolverhampton Wanderers, Preston North End, Sheffield United and Portsmouth. They were the second to achieve this by winning the Fourth Division in the 1991–92 season.

The record for most games played for the club is held by Jerry Dawson, who made 569 appearances between 1907 and 1928. George Beel scored 188 goals during his Burnley career and is the club's record goalscorer. Jimmy McIlroy made 51 appearances for Northern Ireland and so is the player who has gained the most caps while with Burnley. The highest transfer fees paid by the club are the £15 million paid to Leeds United and Middlesbrough for Chris Wood and Ben Gibson in 2017 and 2018 respectively; the highest fees received are the £25 million paid by Everton and Newcastle United for Michael Keane and Wood in 2017 and 2022 respectively. The highest attendance recorded at home ground Turf Moor was 54,775 for the visit of Huddersfield Town in a third round FA Cup match in 1924.

All records and statistics are correct as of the 2021–22 season.

Honours and achievements

Burnley won their first honour in 1883, when the team won the Dr Dean's Cup, a knockout competition between amateur clubs in the Burnley area. The club turned professional by the end of 1883, and was one of the twelve founder members of the Football League in 1888. Burnley reached their first major final in 1914, when they reached the FA Cup Final and beat Liverpool 1–0. Burnley have been champions of England two times, in 1920–21 and 1959–60, and have won the Charity Shield twice, in 1960 (shared with Wolverhampton Wanderers) and 1973. The side have competed in one of the four professional levels of English football from 1888 to the present day, and are one of only five teams—and were the second—to have won all four tiers, along with Wolverhampton Wanderers, Preston North End, Sheffield United and Portsmouth. Burnley's honours include the following:

League
First Division (Tier 1)
Winners: 1920–21, 1959–60
Runners–up: 1919–20, 1961–62
Second Division/Championship (Tier 2)
Winners: 1897–98, 1972–73, 2015–16
Promoted: 1912–13, 1946–47, 2013–14
Play–off winners: 2008–09
Third Division/Second Division (Tier 3)
Winners: 1981–82
Promoted: 1999–2000
Play–off winners: 1993–94
Fourth Division (Tier 4)
Winners: 1991–92

Cup
FA Cup
Winners: 1913–14
Runners–up: 1946–47, 1961–62
FA Charity Shield
Winners: 1960 (shared), 1973
Runners–up: 1921
Texaco Cup
Runners–up: 1973–74
Anglo-Scottish Cup
Winners: 1978–79
Associate Members' Cup
Runners–up: 1987–88
Budapest Cup
Runners–up: 1914

Regional
Lancashire Cup
Winners (12): 1889–90, 1914–15, 1949–50, 1951–52, 1959–60, 1960–61, 1961–62, 1964–65, 1965–66, 1969–70, 1971–72, 1992–93
Runners–up (13): 1899–1900, 1900–01, 1901–02, 1910–11, 1911–12, 1929–30, 1940–41, 1945–46, 1956–57, 1967–68, 1985–86, 2018–19, 2021–22
Dr Dean's Cup
Winners: 1883
Hospital Cup
Winners: 1883–84, 1887–88, 1889–90
East Lancashire Charity Cup
Winners (14): 1892–93, 1893–94, 1898–99, 1904–05, 1905–06, 1906–07, 1907–08, 1911–12, 1914–15, 1919–20, 1920–21, 1921–22, 1923–24 (shared), 1927–28 (shared)
Runners–up (7): 1890–91, 1901–02, 1910–11, 1922–23, 1925–26, 1926–27, 1928–29

Club records

Season records
Most league wins in a season: 26 in 46 matches, Championship, 2013–14 and 2015–16
Fewest league wins in a season: 4 in 22 matches, Football League, 1889–90
Most league draws in a season: 17 in 46 matches, Third Division, 1981–82
Fewest league draws in a season: 3 in 22 matches, Football League, 1888–89 and 1890–91
Most league defeats in a season: 24 in 38 matches, Premier League, 2009–10
Fewest league defeats in a season: 2 in 30 matches, Second Division, 1897–98

Points
Most points in a season:
Two points for a win: 62 in 42 matches, Second Division, 1972–73
Three points for a win: 93 in 46 matches, Championship, 2013–14 and 2015–16
Fewest points in a season:
Two points for a win: 13 in 22 matches, Football League, 1889–90
Three points for a win: 30 in 38 matches, Premier League, 2009–10

Goals
Most league goals scored in a season: 102 in 42 matches, First Division, 1960–61
Fewest league goals scored in a season: 28 in 38 matches, Premier League, 2014–15
Most league goals conceded in a season: 108 in 42 matches, First Division, 1925–26
Fewest league goals conceded in a season: 24 in 30 matches, Second Division, 1897–98

Clean sheets
Most clean sheets in a season: 25 in 51 matches (42 in the Second Division and 9 in the FA Cup), 1946–47

Match records

Firsts
First recorded match: Burnley 4–0 Burnley Wanderers, friendly, 10 August 1882
First match at Turf Moor: Burnley 3–6 Rawtenstall, 17 February 1883
First FA Cup match: Darwen Old Wanderers 11–0 Burnley, first round, 17 October 1885
First league match: Preston North End 5–2 Burnley, 8 September 1888
First League Cup match: Cardiff City 0–4 Burnley, second round, 24 October 1960
First European Cup match: Burnley 2–0 Stade de Reims, first round, 16 November 1960

Record wins
Record win: Burnley 15–0 Haydock, Lancashire Cup, second round, 20 January 1890
Record league win: Burnley 9–0 Darwen, Football League, 9 January 1892
Record away win: Tananarive 1–14 Burnley, in Madagascar, friendly, 9 May 1954
Record league away win: Birmingham 1–7 Burnley, First Division, 10 April 1926
Record FA Cup win: 
Burnley 9–0 Crystal Palace, second round, 10 February 1909
Burnley 9–0 New Brighton, fourth round, 26 January 1957
Penrith 0–9 Burnley, first round, 17 November 1984
Record League Cup win: Burnley 6–0 Grimsby Town, second round, 10 September 1968
Record European win: Burnley 5–0 Lausanne-Sports, Inter-Cities Fairs Cup second round, 25 October 1966

Record defeats
Record defeat: Darwen Old Wanderers 11–0 Burnley, FA Cup first round, 17 October 1885
Record league defeat:
Aston Villa 10–0 Burnley, First Division, 29 August 1925
Sheffield United 10–0 Burnley, First Division, 19 January 1929
Record league home defeat:
Burnley 1–7 Blackburn Rovers, Football League, 3 November 1888
Burnley 0–6 Hereford United, Fourth Division, 24 January 1987
Burnley 0–6 Manchester City, Second Division (third tier), 9 March 1999
Record League Cup defeat: Manchester City 5–0 Burnley, first round, 11 August 1999
Record European defeat: Hamburger SV 4–1 Burnley, European Cup quarter-final, 15 March 1961

Streaks
Longest winning streak (all competitions): 11 matches; 16 November 1912 to 18 January 1913, Second Division (10 matches) and FA Cup (one match)
Longest winning streak at home (all competitions): 18 matches; 6 September 1920 to 2 April 1921, First Division (17 matches) and FA Cup (one match)
Longest winning streak from home (all competitions): 7 matches; 12 October 1991 to 1 January 1992, Fourth Division (six matches) and FA Cup (one match)
Longest unbeaten run (league): 30 matches; 6 September 1920 to 25 March 1921, First Division
Longest unbeaten run at home (league): 34 matches; 1 April 1911 to 4 January 1913, Second Division
Longest unbeaten run from home (league): 15 matches; 15 April 1972 to 6 January 1973, Second Division
Longest drawing streak (league): 6 matches; 21 February to 28 March 1931, Second Division
Longest losing streak (league): 8 matches;
9 November 1889 to 22 February 1890, Football League
16 March to 2 September 1895, First Division
2 January to 25 February 1995, First Division (second tier)
Longest streak without a win (league): 24 matches; 16 April to 17 November 1979, Second Division
Longest scoring run (league): 27 matches; 13 February to 30 October 1926, First Division
Longest non-scoring run (league): 6 matches;
9 August to 7 September 1997, Second Division (third tier)
23 December 2006 to 30 January 2007, Championship
21 March to 2 May 2015, Premier League
Longest streak without conceding a goal (league): 7 matches; 6 September to 4 October 1980, Third Division

Attendances
Highest attendance in a match involving Burnley: 100,000; versus Tottenham Hotspur at Wembley in the 1962 FA Cup Final
Highest home attendance: 54,775; versus Huddersfield Town in the FA Cup third round on 23 February 1924
Lowest home attendance: 400; versus Barnsley and Gainsborough Trinity in the Second Division on 30 March 1901 and 8 March 1902, respectively
Highest home attendance in a league match: 52,869; versus Blackpool in the First Division on 11 October 1947
Highest home attendance in the League Cup: 27,959; versus Manchester United, fourth round, 15 October 1969
Highest average home attendance: 33,621; in the First Division in 1947–48
Lowest average home attendance: 1,500; in the Second Division in 1902–03

Managerial records

First full-time manager: Harry Bradshaw; August 1894 to June 1899
Longest serving manager (time and games): Harry Potts; 728 competitive matches, February 1958 to February 1970 and February 1977 to October 1979
First manager from outside England: Frank Hill; Scottish, managed the club for 266 competitive matches from October 1948 to August 1954
Most wins: Harry Potts; 314 competitive matches (from 728)
Highest win percentage (excluding caretaker managers): Cliff Britton; 49.00%, 49 competitive matches won from 100
Lowest win percentage (excluding caretaker managers): Joe Brown; 22.64%, 12 competitive matches won from 53

Player records

Award winners
FWA Footballer of the Year
Jimmy Adamson – 1961–62
First tier top goal scorer
Willie Irvine – 1965–66

Appearances
Youngest first-team player: Tommy Lawton; 16 years, 174 days (against Doncaster Rovers, Second Division, 28 March 1936)
Oldest first-team player: Len Smelt; 41 years, 132 days (against Arsenal, First Division, 18 April 1925)
Most consecutive league appearances: 203 – Jimmy Strong, 31 August 1946 – 23 March 1951

Most appearances
Competitive first-team appearances only; substitute appearances appear in parentheses; they are in addition to the figures before the brackets and are not included within them.
—Played their full career at Burnley

Goalscorers
Most goals in a season in all competitions: 37 goals;
Jimmy Robson (25 in the First Division, five in the FA Cup, four in the League Cup, and three in the European Cup), 1960–61
Willie Irvine (29 in the First Division, five in the FA Cup, and three in the League Cup), 1965–66
Most league goals in a season: George Beel – 35, First Division, 1927–28
Most goals in a league match: Louis Page – 6, versus Birmingham away (First Division, 10 April 1926)
Most consecutive matches scored in: 8 – Ray Pointer (First Division and FA Cup, 29 November 1958 to 14 January 1959) and Charlie Austin (Championship and League Cup, 15 September 2012 to 23 October 2012)
Most seasons as top goalscorer: George Beel – 6, 1923–24, 1926–27, 1927–28, 1928–29, 1930–31, 1931–32
Most goals on debut: Ian Lawson – 4, versus Chesterfield (FA Cup third round, 5 January 1957)
First goal in the FA Cup: Walter Place, versus Astley Bridge away (first round, 23 October 1886)
First goal in league football: Pat Gallocher (21st minute), versus Preston North End away (Football League, 8 September 1888)
First hat-trick (league): William Tait, versus Bolton Wanderers away (Football League, 15 September 1888)
Most hat-tricks: George Beel – 11, between 1923 and 1931
Fastest hat-trick: Louis Page – 3 minutes, versus Birmingham away (First Division, 10 April 1926)

Overall scorers
Competitive first-team matches only; appearances including substitute appearances appear in parentheses and italics.

Internationals

First capped player: Jack Yates; for England against Ireland on 2 March 1889
First international goalscorer: Jack Yates; for England against Ireland on 2 March 1889 (three goals)
Most capped player while at Burnley: Jimmy McIlroy; 51 appearances for Northern Ireland
Most capped player for England while at Burnley: Bob Kelly; 11 caps
First player to appear in the World Cup Finals: Jock Aird; for Scotland against Austria in Zürich on 16 June 1954
First player to appear in the World Cup Finals for England: Colin McDonald; against the Soviet Union in Gothenburg on 8 June 1958
Most World Cup Finals appearances: Jimmy McIlroy and Billy Hamilton; both five appearances for Northern Ireland in 1958 and 1982, respectively

Transfers

Record transfer fees paid

Record transfer fees received

When forward Bob Kelly moved from Burnley to Sunderland for £6,550 in 1925 (equivalent to £ in ), he broke the world transfer record.

Notes

References
Specific

General
 
 

Records and statistics
Burnley